Lesbian, gay, bisexual, and transgender (LGBT) people living in Saint Lucia face legal challenges not experienced by non-LGBT members of the population. Same-sex sexual activity is illegal for males, though the law is not enforced.

Same-sex sexual activity

Same-sex sexual activity is illegal for males in Saint Lucia.

Laws
The Criminal Code (No. 9 of 2004; Effective 1 January 2005), states:

Gross Indecency

Section 132. 
 (1) Any person who commits an act of gross indecency with another person commits an offence and is liable on conviction on indictment to imprisonment for ten years or on summary conviction to five years.
 (2) Subsection (1) does not apply to an act of gross indecency committed in private between an adult male person and an adult female person, both of whom consent.
 (3) For the purposes of subsection (2) —
(a) an act shall be deemed not to have been committed in private if it is committed in a public place; and
(b) a person shall be deemed not to consent to the commission of such an act if —
 (i) the consent is extorted by force, threats or fear of bodily harm or is obtained by false and fraudulent representations as to the nature of the act;
 (ii) the consent is induced by the application or administration of any drug, matter or thing with intent to intoxicate or stupefy the person; or (iii) that person is, and the other party to the act knows or has good reason to believe that the person is suffering from a mental disorder.
 (4) In this section "gross indecency" is an act other than sexual intercourse (whether natural or unnatural) by a person involving the use of the genital organs for the purpose of arousing or gratifying sexual desire".

Buggery
 Section 133.
 (1) A person who commits buggery commits an offence and is liable on conviction on indictment to imprisonment for —
 (a) life, if committed with force and without the consent of the other person;
 (b) ten years, in any other case.
 (2) Any person who attempts to commit buggery, or commits an assault with intent to commit buggery, commits an offence and is liable to imprisonment for five years.
 (3) In this section "buggery" means sexual intercourse per anus by a male person with another male person".

Multiple sources state that these laws are not enforced.

Decriminalisation efforts

In November 2017, while speaking at the Caribbean Center for Family and Human Rights (CARIFAM) meeting, External Affairs Minister Sarah Flood-Beaubrun has reiterated her position that government "will stick to its decision to refrain from decriminalising buggery and prostitution despite mounting pressure from international countries and organisations."

In February 2019, after the murder by stabbing of a 27-year-old Guyanese Michael Pooran in Saint Lucia, the "Eastern Caribbean Alliance for Diversity and Equality" (ECADE) and "United & Strong" organisations said it is alleged that Pooran's death is due to his perceived sexual orientation. They have urged the government of Saint Lucia to "strongly denounce any forms of violence and discrimination on the basis of sexual orientation, gender identity and expression". and to "encourage the governments of St Lucia and the eastern Caribbean to re-examine the impact of the Buggery and Gross indecency Laws that are widely interpreted as criminalisation of the LGBT community".

In March 2019, It was reported that Senator Hermangild Francis, the Justice and National Security Minister and the former Deputy Police Commissioner, supports a review of Saint Lucia's buggery law. He told reporters "If Saint Lucians want that to be revisited I have no problems with that. But I think the time has come when we really have to look at it. Too many young people are being maligned because of their sexual orientation. I don’t think that’s right. Everyone should be entitled to his or her own sexual, political and religious beliefs. I agree that we should have a review of it. Homosexuality with consenting adults in their privacy – I see no problem, but like I said, everybody is entitled to their opinion and we must respect everybody in that kind of discussion."

In late March 2019, The head of the Catholic Church in Saint Lucia, Archbishop Robert Rivas, has asserted that the church is not against gays or lesbians and has expressed the hope that the governments in the region will 'do what is right' on the matter of the law against buggery. He said: "In some places, it is already removed. If it is a law that is distressing and it is not a law that is serving its purpose the way it ought to have served its purpose in the past, then it has to be reviewed and updated." He added that: "The church is not against gays or lesbians – the church is maybe against the activity where there is a moral issue, but in terms of the person, the church will always love the person and care for the person as Jesus did." and that "Whoever said the church is against [homosexuals] is probably misinformed about the church today, I have never said that in my preaching in Saint Lucia. I’ve been here eleven years and a bishop for 29 years. I’ve never preached that, and I’ve never heard our archdiocese preach that." saying that the time may be right to revisit the island's buggery. Days later, in early April, Superintendent Methodist Minister, Seth Ampadu of the Methodist Church here welcomes gays and lesbians, but not their activities, he also said that the law is distressing and it is not serving its purpose, then it has to be reviewed and updated. It has plans to decriminalize homosexuality by 2022.

Opposition to the UN declaration 
Saint Lucia was the only UN member in the Americas to formally oppose the UN declaration on sexual orientation and gender identity.

Discrimination protections
Article 131 of the Labour Code, enacted in 2006, bans "unfair dismissal" based on sexual orientation.

The Domestic Violence Act passed on March 8, 2022, extends all its protections to LGBTQ people.

Living conditions

In June 2011, then Minister for Education and Culture, Arsene James, stated his view that there was nothing wrong with having discussions on homosexuality within schools.

In 2011, then Minister for Tourism and Civil Aviation Allen Chastanet apologized to three American gay men who were violently attacked and robbed inside a vacation villa by assailants who called them "faggots", saying: "Whether or not this crime was motivated by anti-gay sentiment, or during the course of a robbery, it is nonetheless unacceptable behavior and Saint Lucia as a destination will not tolerate it … Saint Lucia has always been a safe destination, respectful of people’s own choices for religion, beliefs and perspectives on life".

In April 2015, Lorne Theophilus, then Minister of Tourism, Information and Broadcasting, said that Saint Lucia welcomes visitors from the LGBT community, that it has always welcomed gay tourists, but that no changes are planned for Saint Lucia's colonial-era "buggery" laws.

In May 2015, in light of the success of the 2014 human rights sensitisation training which sought to educate the Royal Saint Lucia Police Force on both general and LGBT-specific content, a further training initiative was organised by United and Strong. United and Strong extended its efforts to other law enforcement and community service providers, focusing on officers from the Air and Sea Ports, Customs and Corrections as well as members of civil society who interface with law enforcement on behalf of their community.

In 2017, in an interview, Dominic Fedee, then Minister of Tourism, Tnformation and Broadcasting, reiterated that Saint Lucia welcomes visitors from the LGBT community, saying that the country does not actively seek to attract LGBTQ travellers specifically though everyone is welcome, and that he worked in the hospitality industry for 16 years and they welcomed many gay couples, and that it is a common practice.

In 2017, responding to an article by Pinknews about the situation of LGBT rights in Saint Lucia, Jassica St Rose, Women's Secretariat Representative of the International Lesbian, Gay, Bisexual, Trans and Intersex Association (ILGA) said, "While we do have buggery laws on the statute books, they have not recently been enforced. Moreover, currently no-one is imprisoned in Saint Lucia for being gay. It would have been instructive if "Pink News" had contacted United and Strong or ECADE for comment." Adaryl Williams, of the local LGBT association United and Strong said, "Yes, discriminatory laws exist, however we’ve had gay cruises and gay couples and people visiting here safely. There are several hotel properties with policies in support of LGBT persons".

In August 2017, LGBT association "United and Strong" welcomed the views expressed by officials of the Catholic Church who believe that gay people should not be discriminated against.

In May 2017, International Day Against Homophobia, Transphobia and Biphobia (IDAHOT) was celebrated at the British High Commission to Saint Lucia with LGBT association United and Strong's members and staff.

In March 2019, the Upper Tribunal decided that gay men are at risk of persecution in St Lucia and can claim asylum in the United Kingdom.

March 2019 saw the suicide of the 17-year-old allegedly openly gay teenager Gervais Emmanuel, because of alleged homophobic bullying and pressure. The suicide reignited conversation on homophobia in Saint Lucia and the poor treatment towards members of the island's LGBTQ community by the general public. A march against bullying took place weeks later in a campaign against bullying in Soufrière where Education Officer for District 8, Shervon Mangroo, made a call to students of Soufrière to denounce bullying in any form or fashion.

In May 2019, the British TV show Blind Date was criticized for sending two bisexual contestants to where same-sex sexual acts were illegal. Jordan Shannon, was paired up with Jesse Drew. The producers of the show said they didn't know that, and although Jesse was anxious about that, Jordan was shocked at first but said it would not be a concern saying after they came back safely to the United Kingdom that: "Regardless, locals were still very helpful and looked after us while we were on our dates".

Pride parades

The first gay pride parade was scheduled for 23–26 August 2019, with "Persist with pride" as a celebration theme. It included activities aimed at educating and sensitising the general public, as well as nurturing the dignity of LGBT people on Saint Lucia, and public activities included a panel on LGBT in Saint Lucia, and the Family Day and Health Fair, which included health talks and screenings, congratulatory speeches, performances and giveaways. The Pentecostal Assemblies of the West Indies (PAWI) voiced its objection to the pride event, however the Roman Catholic Archbishop Robert Rivas of the Archdiocese of Castries in Saint Lucia said his church was not opposed to the pride event.

Summary table

See also 
 
Politics of Saint Lucia
LGBT rights in the Commonwealth of Nations
LGBT rights in La Francophonie
LGBT rights in the Americas
LGBT rights by country or territory

References

 
Politics of Saint Lucia